Juan Carlos I of Spain (born 1938) is a former king of Spain.

Juan Carlos may also refer to:
 Juan Carlos (footballer, born 1945) (1945–2012), Spanish footballer
 Juan Domecq or Juan Carlos (born 1950), Cuban basketball player
 Juan Carlos (footballer, born 1956), Spanish footballer
 Juan Carlos (footballer, born 1965), Spanish footballer and manager
 Juan Carlos (weightlifter) (born 1965), Spanish Olympic weightlifter
 Juan Carlos (footballer, born 1973), Spanish footballer
 Juan Belencoso or Juan Carlos (born 1981), Spanish footballer
 Juan Carlos (footballer, born 1987), Spanish footballer
 Jake Cuenca or Juan Carlos (born 1987), American-Filipino actor and footballer
 Juan Carlos (footballer, born 1988), Spanish footballer
 Juan Carlos (footballer, born 1990), Spanish footballer
 Spanish amphibious assault ship Juan Carlos I
 Juan Carlos I Antarctic Base
 Juan Carlos I Park, a Madrid park

People with the given names

Footballers
 Juan Carlos Ablanedo (born 1963), Spanish footballer
 Juan Carlos Almada (born 1962), Argentine footballer
 Juan Carlos Álvarez (born 1954), Spanish footballer and manager
 Juan Carlos Anangonó (born 1989), Ecuadorian footballer
 Juan Carlos Arce (born 1985), Bolivian footballer
 Juan Carlos Arguedas (born 1970), Costa Rican footballer and manager
 Juan Carlos Arteche (1957–2010), Spanish footballer
 Juan Carlos Burbano (born 1969), Ecuadorian footballer and manager
 Juan Carlos Buzzetti (born 1945), Uruguayan football manager
 Juan Carlos Cacho (born 1982), Mexican footballer
 Juan Carlos Calvo (1906–1977), Uruguayan footballer
 Juan Carlos Carone (born 1942), Argentine footballer
 Juan Carlos Ceballos (born 1983), Spanish footballer
 Juan Carlos Chávez (born 1967), Mexican footballer and manager
 Juan Carlos Corazzo (1907–1986), Uruguayan footballer and manager
 Juan Carlos de la Barrera (born 1983), Mexican footballer
 Juan Carlos de Lima (born 1962), Uruguayan footballer
 Juan Carlos Enríquez (born 1990), Mexican footballer
 Juan Carlos Espinoza (born 1986), Chilean footballer
 Juan Carlos Espinoza (Honduran footballer) (born 1958), Honduran footballer and manager
 Juan Carlos Franco (born 1973), Paraguayan footballer
 Juan Carlos Garay (born 1968), Ecuadorian footballer
 Juan Carlos García (Honduran footballer) (1988–2018), Honduran footballer
 Juan Carlos García (Mexican footballer) (born 1985), Mexican footballer
 Juan Carlos García Rulfo (born 1980), Mexican footballer
 Juan Carlos Garrido (born 1969), Spanish football manager
 Juan Carlos González (1924–2010), Uruguayan footballer
 Juan Carlos González (Chilean footballer) (born 1968), Chilean footballer
 Juan Carlos Henao (born 1971), Colombian footballer
 Juan Carlos Ibáñez (1969–2015), Argentine footballer
 Juan Carlos La Rosa (born 1980), Peruvian footballer
 Juan Carlos Leaño (born 1977), Mexican footballer
 Juan Carlos Lorenzo (1922–2001), Argentine footballer and manager
 Juan Carlos Loustau (born 1947), Argentine football referee
 Juan Carlos Mandiá (born 1967), Spanish footballer and manager
 Juan Carlos Mariño (born 1982), Peruvian footballer
 Juan Carlos Martín Corral (born 1988), Spanish footballer
 Juan Carlos Medina (born 1983), Mexican footballer
 Juan Carlos Morrone (born 1941), Argentine footballer and manager
 Juan Carlos Moscoso (born 1982), Salvadoran footballer
 Juan Carlos Muñoz (1919–2009), Argentine footballer
 Juan Carlos Muñoz (Chilean footballer) (born 1978), Chilean footballer
 Juan Carlos Núñez (born 1983), Mexican footballer
 Juan Carlos Oblitas (born 1951), Peruvian footballer and manager
 Juan Carlos Oleniak (born 1942), Argentine footballer
 Juan Carlos Oliva (born 1965), Spanish football manager
 Juan Carlos Orellana (born 1955), Chilean footballer
 Juan Carlos Paredes (born 1989), Ecuadorian footballer
 Juan Carlos Real Ruiz (born 1991), Spanish footballer
 Juan Carlos Reyes (footballer) (born 1976), Uruguayan footballer
 Juan Carlos Ríos Vidal (born 1964), Spanish footballer and manager
 Juan Carlos Rojas (footballer) (born 1984), Mexican footballer
 Juan Carlos Rojo (born 1959), Spanish footballer and manager
 Juan Carlos Sánchez (born 1956), Argentine-Bolivian footballer
 Juan Carlos Sánchez Martínez (born 1987), Spanish footballer
 Juan Carlos Sarnari (born 1942), Argentine footballer and manager
 Juan Carlos Touriño (born 1944), Spanish-Argentine footballer and manager
 Juan Carlos Unzué (born 1967), Spanish footballer and manager
 Juan Carlos Valenzuela (footballer) (born 1984), Mexican footballer
 Juan Carlos Valerón (born 1975), Spanish footballer
 Juan Carlos Vidal (born 1954),Spanish footballer
 Juan Carlos Villamayor (born 1969), Paraguayan footballer

Other sportspeople
 Juan Carlos Báguena (born 1967), Spanish tennis player and coach
 Juan Carlos Bianchi (born 1970), Venezuelan tennis player
 Juan Carlos Blum (born 1994), Mexican stock car racing driver
 Juan Carlos Candelo (born 1974), Colombian boxer
 Juan Carlos Cardona (born 1974), Colombian marathon runner
 Juan Carlos de la Ossa (born 1976), Spanish middle-distance runner
 Juan Carlos Domínguez (born 1971), Spanish bicycle road racer
 Juan Carlos Fernández (born 1976), Colombian weightlifter
 Juan Carlos Giménez Ferreyra (born 1960), Paraguayan boxer
 Juan Carlos Higuero (born 1978), Spanish middle-distance runner
 Juan Carlos Infante (born 1981), Venezuelan baseball player
 Juan Carlos Lemus (born 1965), Cuban boxer
 Juan Carlos Moreno (baseball) (born 1975), Cuban baseball player
 Juan Carlos Nájera (born 1981), Guatemala triple jumper and coach
 Juan Carlos Navarro (basketball) (born 1980), Spanish basketball player
 Juan Carlos Oviedo (born 1982), Dominican Republic baseball player
 Juan Carlos Payano (born 1984), Dominican Republic boxer
 Juan Carlos Pérez (born 1981), Bolivian trap shooter
 Juan Carlos Ramírez (born 1977), Mexican boxer
 Juan Carlos Romero (athlete) (born 1977), Mexican long-distance runner
 Juan Carlos Sáez (born 1991), Chilean tennis player
 Juan Carlos Sánchez, Jr. (born 1991), Mexican boxer
 Juan Carlos Spir (born 1990), Colombian tennis player
 Juan Carlos Stevens (born 1968), Cuban archer
 Juan Carlos Vallejo (born 1963), Spanish swimmer
 Juan Carlos Zabala (1911–1983), Argentine athlete

Creative arts
 Juan Carlos Alarcón (born 1971), Venezuelan actor
 Juan Carlos Altavista (1929–1989), Argentine actor and comedian
 Juan Carlos Barreto (born 1957), Mexican actor
 Juan Carlos Calabró (1934–2013), Argentine actor and comedian
 Juan Carlos Calderón (1938–2012), Spanish singer-songwriter
 Juan Carlos Cobián (1888–1942), Argentine bandleader and tango composer
 Juan Carlos Cremata Malberti (born 1961), Cuban film director
 Juan Carlos Echeverry (singer) (born 1971), Colombian tenor
 Juan Carlos Fresnadillo (born 1967), Spanish film director
 Juan Carlos García (actor) (born 1971), Venezuelan actor
 Juan Carlos Gené (1929–2012), Argentine actor and playwright
 Juan Carlos Macías (born 1945), Argentine film editor
 Juan Carlos Rodríguez (boxer) (born 1990), Venezuelan boxer
 Juan Carlos Tabío (born 1942), Cuban film director
 Juan Carlos Zaldívar, Cuban-American filmmaker

Politicians
 Juan Carlos Blanco Fernández (1847–1910), Uruguayan politician
 Juan Carlos Echeverry (politician) (born 1962), Colombian economist and politician
 Juan Carlos Eguren (born 1965), Peruvian politician
 Juan Carlos Esguerra Portocarrero (born 1949), Colombian politician
 Juan Carlos García Padilla (born 1968), Puerto Rican politician
 Juan Carlos Latorre (born 1949), Chilean politician
 Juan Carlos Marino (Argentine politician) (born 1963), Argentine politician
 Juan Carlos Mendoza García (born 1975), Costa Rican politician
 Juan Carlos Navarro (politician) (born 1961), Panamanian politician and businessman
 Juan Carlos Muñoz Márquez (born 1950), Mexican politician
 Juan Carlos Onganía (1914–1995), Argentine soldier and politician
 Juan Carlos Pérez Góngora (born 1960), Mexican politician
 Juan Carlos Pinzón (born 1971), Colombian politician
 Juan Carlos Reyes (governor) (died 2007), Argentine politician
 Juan Carlos Robinson Agramonte (born 1956), Cuban politician
 Juan Carlos Rodríguez Ibarra (born 1948), Spanish politician
 Juan Carlos Romero (politician) (born 1950), Argentine politician
 Juan Carlos Romero Hicks (born 1955), Mexican politician
 Juan Carlos Varela (born 1963), Panamanian politician
 Juan Carlos Wasmosy (born 1938), Paraguayan politician

Other people
 Juan Carlos Caballero Vega (1900–2010), Mexican revolutionary
 Juan Carlos de Aréizaga (died 1816), Spanish general
 Juan Carlos Ortíz, advertising executive in the American Advertising Federation Hall of Fame
 Juan Carlos Pavía, Puerto Rican civil servant

See also
 Estadio Juan Carlos Durán, a stadium in Bolivia
 John Charles (disambiguation)